William M. Childress (1867–1940) was an American professional baseball player who pitched in one game for the Louisville Colonels of the National League on July 27, 1895. He allowed two hits, walked five, threw three wild pitches, and allowed six runs to score—all without recording an out. As this was his only major league appearance, he is credited with an infinite earned run average.

References

External links

1867 births
1940 deaths
Major League Baseball pitchers
Louisville Colonels players
Baseball players from Tennessee
19th-century baseball players